The 1930–31 FA Cup was the 56th staging of the world's oldest football cup competition, the Football Association Challenge Cup, commonly known as the FA Cup. West Bromwich Albion of the Football League Second Division won the competition, beating First Division team Birmingham 2–1 in the final at Wembley, London. In doing so Albion became the first and to date only club to both win the cup and gain promotion in the same year.

Matches were played at the stadium of the team named first on the date specified for each round, which was always a Saturday. If scores were level after 90 minutes had been played, a replay would take place at the stadium of the second-named team later the same week. If the replayed match was drawn further replays would be held at neutral venues until a winner was determined. If scores were level after 90 minutes had been played in a replay, a 30-minute period of extra time would be played.

Calendar

Results

First Round Proper
At this stage clubs from the Football League Third Division North and South (except Hull City and Brighton & Hove Albion, byes to third round) joined those non-league clubs having come through the qualifying rounds. Matches were played on Saturday, 29 November 1930. Six matches were drawn, with replays taking place later the same week.

Second Round Proper 	
The matches were played on Saturday, 13 December 1930. Two matches were drawn, with replays taking place on Thursday, 18 December 1930.

Third Round Proper
The 44 First and Second Division club plus Third Division clubs Hull City and Brighton & Hove Albion and amateur club Corinthian entered the competition at this stage. The matches were scheduled to be played on Saturday, 10 January 1931, though one was postponed until later the same week. Nine matches were drawn, with replays taking place later the same week. Three matches required a second replay; these were all played on Monday, 19 January 1931.

Fourth Round Proper
The matches were played on Saturday, 24 January 1931. Two matches were drawn, the replays being played on Wednesday, 28 January 1931.

Fifth Round Proper
The matches were played on Saturday, 14 February 1931. No replays were necessary.

Final rounds

Sixth Round Proper

Replays

Semifinals

Final

The final took place on Saturday, 25 April 1931 at Wembley and ended in a victory for West Bromwich Albion by 2–1, with goals scored by "Ginger" Richardson for West Bromwich Albion and Joe Bradford for Birmingham. The attendance was 92,406.

Notes

References
The FA Cup Archive at TheFA.com
English FA Cup 1930–31 at Soccerbase

FA Cup seasons
FA
Cup